Yoo Young-joo (born 23 November 1971) is a South Korean basketball player. She competed in the women's tournament at the 1996 Summer Olympics.

References

External links
 

1971 births
Living people
South Korean women's basketball players
Olympic basketball players of South Korea
Basketball players at the 1996 Summer Olympics
People from Imsil County
Asian Games medalists in basketball
Asian Games gold medalists for South Korea
Asian Games bronze medalists for South Korea
Basketball players at the 1994 Asian Games
Basketball players at the 1998 Asian Games
Medalists at the 1994 Asian Games
Medalists at the 1998 Asian Games
Sportspeople from North Jeolla Province